The 1927 USSR Chess Championship was the fifth edition of USSR Chess Championship. Held from 26 September to 25 October in Moscow. Fedir Bohatyrchuk and Peter Romanovsky were declared champions, since a tie-break match cannot be scheduled. An indication of the enhanced prestige of chess ins Soviet Union was the championship venue, the Hall of Columns of the House of Unions, one of the most eminent locations in the country. That edition also featured the debut of the future world chess champion and 16 year old young talent Mikhail Botvinnik.

Table and results

References 

USSR Chess Championships
Championship
Chess
1927 in chess
1927 in the Soviet Union
Chess